A slush fund is a fund or account used for miscellaneous income and expenses, particularly when these are corrupt or illegal. Such funds may be kept hidden and maintained separately from money that is used for legitimate purposes. Slush funds may be employed by government or corporate officials in efforts to pay influential people discreetly in return for preferential treatment, advance information (such as non-public information in financial transactions), and other services. The funds themselves may not be kept secret but the source of the funds or how they were acquired or for what purposes they are used may be hidden. Use of slush funds to influence government activities may be viewed as subversive of the democratic process.

A slush fund can also be a reserve account used to reduce fluctuations in an organization's earnings by withholding them when they are high and supplementing them when they are low. This type of slush fund is not inherently corrupt, but is nonetheless a form of earnings management that tends to mislead the public about the organization's financial condition.

Examples 
Richard Nixon's "Checkers speech" of 1952 was a somewhat successful effort to dispel a scandal concerning a slush fund of campaign contributions. Years later, Nixon's presidential re-election campaign used slush funds to buy the silence of the "White House Plumbers".

Financial derivative traders for Enron employed a slush fund system called "prudency reserves," in which the department reported part of each trade's profit or loss to the company and withheld the remainder. This system was originally used to regulate the trading department's profits, but also enabled the company to conceal large profits during the 2000–01 California electricity crisis.

Etymology 
"Slush fund" was originally a nautical term for the cash that a ship's crew raised by selling fat (slush) scraped from cooking pots to tallow makers. This cash was kept separate from the ship's accounts and used to make small purchases for the crew.

See also 
 ISO 37001 Anti-bribery management systems
 Group of States Against Corruption
 International Anti-Corruption Academy
 United Nations Convention against Corruption
 OECD Anti-Bribery Convention

References 

Corruption
Financial crimes
Funds
Nautical terminology